Chinglensana Singh Konsham (born 23 November 1996), simply Sana Singh, is an Indian professional footballer who plays as a centre-back for Indian Super League club Hyderabad and the India national team.

Club career
Born in Manipur, Singh started to play football from the age of seven. He started his career in the youth setup of Mahindra United, where he was a part of the team that won the Manchester United Premier Cup in 2010. He also played for the Air India under-15 side for a spell. In 2012, he joined the Tata Football Academy where he played for their under-17 and under-19 sides. While with Tata, Singh helped the academy win the I-League U19 in 2014. Singh also went on exposure tours to Sheffield, England, where he played for the Sheffield United under-18 side.

Shillong Lajong
In August 2015, Singh joined Shillong Lajong. On 4 January 2016 it was announced that Singh signed professional terms with Shillong Lajong in the I-League. He made his professional debut for the side on 10 January 2016 in the club's opening match of the season against Mumbai. He played the full match as Shillong Lajong drew 0–0.

Delhi Dynamos (loan)
Delhi Dynamos announced that they had signed Sanna along with his club team-mate Rupert Nongrum on loan from Shillong Lajong for the 2016 Indian Super League season. Under coach Gianluca Zambrotta, Sanna featured in a total of 12 games for the Dynamos, playing the majority of the time in his preferred position at center back.

Goa
Sanna was predominantly a squad player at Goa in the Indian Super League under Lobera, where he featured for the team 19 times over the course of 3 seasons.

Hyderabad
On 5 September 2020, Sanna penned a two-year deal with Hyderabad. He played a crucial role and helped the team winning 2021–22 Indian Super League.

International
Sana has represented India at the under-19 level.

On July 24, 2016, it was announced that Sana had been called for an India National Team preparatory camp along with his Shillong Lajong teammate Isaac. Sanna made it to the 20 man India National team squad to play an unofficial friendly against Bhutan on August 13, 2017. Sana was featured in the game against Bhutan coming on as a 47th-minute substitute for Dhanpal Ganesh. He was also an unused substitute when India took on Puerto Rico in a FIFA Friendly in Mumbai on September 3, 2017.

On 2 March 2021, Sana got selected for the 35-man-squad national camp ahead of India national team's friendlies against Oman and UAE. On 25 March 2021, Sana made his international debut for India against Oman, which ended on a 1–1 draw.

Career statistics

Club

International

Honours

Club 
FC Goa
Indian Super Cup: 2019
 Hyderabad FC
 Indian Super League: 2021–22

International

 India

 SAFF Championship: 2021

References

1996 births
Living people
Indian footballers
Mahindra United FC players
Air India FC players
Shillong Lajong FC players
Association football defenders
Footballers from Manipur
I-League players
India youth international footballers
India international footballers
Odisha FC players
FC Goa players
Hyderabad FC players
Indian Super League players